Monnett may refer to:

People:
Mary Monnett Bain (born Mary Monnett) (1833–1885), American Methodist
Monnett Bain Davis (1893–1953), American Ambassador
Bob Monnett (1910–1978), professional American football player
Charles Monnett, Ph.D. is an Arctic Wildlife biologist with U.S. Bureau of Ocean Energy Management, Regulation and Enforcement
Vern Monnett (born 1959), American country and rock musician and actor, producer, and composer

Places:
Monnett, Ohio, unincorporated community in Dallas Township, Crawford County, Ohio, United States

Aircraft:
John Monnett – Sonex Aircraft, American aircraft kit manufacturer located in Oshkosh, Wisconsin
Monnett Sonerai, small, VW powered homebuilt aircraft designed by John Monnett
Monnett Experimental Aircraft, United States aircraft manufacturer
Monnett Mini, also called the Mini Messashidt, was an early John Monnett modification of the Parker Jeanies Teenie
Monnett Monerai, sailplane that was developed in the United States in the late 1970s for homebuilding
Monnett Monex, single seat, all-aluminium, Volkswagen powered, homebuilt racer
Monnett Moni, sport aircraft developed in the United States in the early 1980s and marketed for homebuilding

See also
Monnett Memorial M. E. Chapel (Monnett Chapel) is a historic church at 999 OH 98 in Bucyrus, Ohio
Monnett Hall or Ohio Women's Methodist Seminary, seminary located in Delaware, Ohio
Monnet (disambiguation)